Events in the year 1508 in Portugal.

Incumbents
King of Portugal and the Algarves: Manuel I

Events
March - Battle of Chaul
Afonso de Albuquerque began his term as Governor of Portuguese India.
Duarte de Menezes began his term as Governor of Tangier.

Deaths
March - Lourenço de Almeida, explorer and military commander (born c.1480)
18 September - Jorge da Costa, Cardinal (born 1406)
Isaac Abrabanel, statesman, philosopher, Bible commentator and financier (born 1437)

See also
History of Portugal (1415–1578)

References

 
Years of the 16th century in Portugal
Portugal